Iván Andrés Rojas Vásquez (24 July 1997) is a footballer from Colombia who plays as a midfielder for Envigado F.C.

References

1997 births
Living people
Colombian footballers
Association football forwards
Envigado F.C. players